Organoyttrium chemistry is the study of compounds containing carbon-yttrium bonds.  These compounds are almost invariably formal Y3+ derivatives, are generally diamagnetic and colorless, a consequence of the closed-shell configuration of the trication. Organoyttrium compounds are mainly of academic interest.

References 

Yttrium compounds
Organometallic compounds